Scally v Southern Health and Social Services Board [1992] 1 AC 294 is an English contract law case, relevant for pensions and UK labour law, concerning implied terms.

Facts
Dr Gabriel Scally and three other doctors were employees of either the Southern or Eastern Health and Social Services Boards in Northern Ireland. In consequence of the long duration of undergraduate medical training, six years, they would not have been in paid employment for the requisite 40 years before retirement to get full superannuation (or pension) benefits by the time they reached 60 years of age. But by law they could "top up" their superannuation by a lump sum purchase of added years of superannuation entitlement within twelve months of beginning their first period of employment in the Health and Social Services. Their employer did not inform them of this option within the twelve month time limit and therefore they were not in a position to take advantage of the enhancement.

Reynold QC, counsel for the employees, argued a ‘necessary’ term of employment was information about exercising rights under the superannuation scheme.

Judgment
The House of Lords held that the employers had breached a contractual duty, implied into the employment contracts, to properly inform their employees about their rights.

Lord Bridge, distinguished terms implied ‘in fact’ to reflect the parties’ unexpressed common intentions and those implied ‘in law’. He went on as follows.

Lord Roskill, Lord Goff, Lord Jauncey and Lord Lowry concurred.

See also

Equitable Life Assurance Society v Hyman [2002] 1 AC 408
Crossley v Faithful & Gould Holdings Ltd [2004] EWCA Civ 293
Attorney General of Belize v Belize Telecom Ltd

Notes

References

English contract case law
House of Lords cases
United Kingdom labour case law
United Kingdom employment contract case law
1992 in case law
1992 in British law